Wentworthville was an electoral district of the Legislative Assembly in the Australian state of New South Wales, first created in 1962. The seat was absorbed into surrounding electorates in a redistribution prior to the 1991 election and recreated in the redistribution prior to the 1999 election. At the 2003 election, Pam Allan won the seat with 54% of the first preference votes. This was a marginal improvement over the 1999 election. It was abolished again for the 2007 election, with the larger part of it going to the new electoral district of Toongabbie.

Between 2003 and 2007, the electorate covers 21,589 km2, taking in suburbs from several local government areas including Girraween, Greystanes, Northmead, Pendle Hill, Toongabbie, Winston Hills, Wentworthville and part of Prospect.

Members

Election results

References

External links 

Former electoral districts of New South Wales
1962 establishments in Australia
Constituencies established in 1962
1991 disestablishments in Australia
Constituencies disestablished in 1991
1999 establishments in Australia
Constituencies established in 1999
2007 disestablishments in Australia
Constituencies disestablished in 2007